Jacob "Jack" Myron Price, FBA, FRHS, (8 November 1925 – 6 May 2015) was a historian known for his detailed studies of the early modern Atlantic economy. He was closely associated with the Institute of Historical Research of London University.

Selected publications
Reading for Life. Developing the college student's life-time reading interest. University of Michigan Press, Ann Arbor, 1959. (Editor)
The tobacco adventure to Russia. Enterprise, politics, and diplomacy in the quest for a northern market for English colonial tobacco, 1676-1722. Philadelphia, 1961. (Transactions of the American Philosophical Society. New series, Vol. 51, part 1.)
The dimensions of the past. Materials, problems, and opportunities for quantitative work in history. American Historical Association. Committee on Quantitative Data. Yale University Press, New Haven, 1972. (Edited with Val R. Lorwin)
France and the Chesapeake. A history of the French tobacco monopoly, 1674-1791, and of its relationship to the British and American tobacco trades, etc. University of Michigan Press, Ann Arbor, 1973. 
Joshua Johnson's letterbook, 1771-1774: Letters from a merchant in London to his partners in Maryland . London Record Society, London, 1979. (Editor) 
Capital and credit in British overseas trade: The view from the Chesapeake, 1700-1776. Harvard University Press, Cambridge, Mass., 1980. 
Perry of London: A family and a firm on the seaborne frontier, 1615-1753. Harvard University Press, Cambridge, Mass., 1992. 
Tobacco in Atlantic trade: The Chesapeake, London and Glasgow 1675-1775. Variorum, Aldershot, 1995. 
Overseas trade and traders: Essays on some commercial, financial, and political challenges facing British Atlantic merchants, 1660-1775. Variorum, Aldershot, 1996. 
The Atlantic frontier of the thirteen American colonies and states: Essays in eighteenth century commercial and social history. Variorum, Aldershot, 1996.

References 

1925 births
2015 deaths
Harvard University alumni
Harvard University faculty
University of Michigan faculty
Fellows of the Royal Historical Society
Fellows of the British Academy
20th-century American Jews
21st-century American Jews